Suleiman Abdu Kwari is a Nigerian politician and public finance management expert, senator for the Kaduna North Senatorial district of Kaduna State Nigeria. He was elected during the February 2019 Nigerian general elections under the platform of the All Progressives Congress (APC). He was the commissioner of finance Kaduna State (2015-2019) appointed by the governor of Kaduna State Nasir Ahmad el-Rufai and was also a member of the House of Representatives from Sabon Gari local government constituency of Kaduna State.

Background 
Kwari was born on the 12 June 1962 in Sabon Gari Local Government Area of kaduna state. He started his education at Army Primary School. Zaria and thereafter proceeded to the highly prestigious Commonwealth College of Commerce Jos, Plateau State from 1975 to 1980 for his secondary education. He obtained a bachelor of Science Degree in Business Administration from Ahmadu Bello University, Zaria in 1984 and also successfully completed his master's degree programme in Business Administration at same university in 1988.

Early political career
Kwari's passion for his people motivated him to contest election in 1991
As a sabon Gari local government charman  which saw him emerge as the first executive charman of Sabon Gari Local Government Area . After completion of his tenure, he was appointed Assistant General manager (Administration) at the Nigerian Reinsurance Cooperation between 1995 and 2000. He was elected as member of Federal House of Representatives sabon Gari federal constituency in the  4th assembly. He was appointed as the Deputy chief of staff to the kaduna state Governor in 2003. He also serve as a federal commissioner (Finance and Administration) in security and exchange commission. He serve as  commissioner of finance, kaduna state from 2015 to 2019. He contest and won the 2019 general election as a senator prepresenting kaduna North senatorial district.

Senate
Sulaiman abdu kwari represent the people of kaduna North in the ninth Senate of national assembly in the platform of All progressive Congress, APC. He is the charman of senate committee on anti-corruption and financial crimes. Sulaiman abdu kwari has sponsored and co- sponsored several motions and Bill's which included.

BIlls
Legislative bills cooperate social responsibility bill 
Federal college of crop science and technology lere Kaduna State
witness protection and management
money laundering prevention and Prohibition Enactment Bill
Public interest disclosure and Complaints Enactment Bill
Code of conduct
Anti-Corruption Tribunal Act Amendment Bill
Armed forces (joint security operation and synergy, etc) bill
tertiary education reform bill                  
Terrorism prevention and prohibition Act forfeited
Asset management Authority (Enactment) Bill (SB.643)
Constitution Alteration Bill  
Constitution Alteration Bill (SB.699)
Constitution Alteration Bill ( SB.704)
Code of conduct and anti-corruption tribunal Act ( Amendment) Bill (SB.727)

Motions
Need to address the increasing rate of traffic accidents along Abuja-Kaduna-Zaria-Kano Road
Need to critically assess the performance of economic and growth plan (ERGP) 2017 to 2020
Need to make the National Health Insurance Scheme (NHIS) work for Nigeria citizens 
Ijegun pipelines explosion urgent need to prevent pipelines vandalization and explosion resulting to deaths and massive destruction of properties 
Major military offensive against bandits in Katsina State. Need to integrate adjoining state of Niger, Zamfara, Kaduna, Kebbi and Sokoto

Constituency projects
Kwari has constituency projects spread across all the eight local government Areas in his senatorial district (Kaduna North) As a senator, he is always struggling for the development of his people and the nation's since he assumed office. Kwari alone has facilitated more than 60 intervention projects across his senatorial district. These projects includes, construction of classrooms, model primary Health care centers, electrification of rural areas and construction of motorized boreholes were delivered to the residents of selected communities based on their need. Kwari also created job opportunities for the youths of his Constitution.

Awards and honours
 Chartered Institute of Administration, Professional Practicomg License.
 Fellow, Chartered Institute of Administration (FCIA).
 Fellow, Institute of Chartered Economists of Nigeria (FICEN).
 Member, Nigeria Institute of Management (MNIM).

References

1962 births
Living people
Politicians from Kaduna State